Phalaenopsis amabilis, commonly known as the moon orchid, moth orchid, or mariposa orchid, is a species of flowering plant in the orchid family Orchidaceae. It is widely cultivated as a decorative houseplant. It is an epiphytic or lithophytic herb with long, thick roots, between two and eight thick, fleshy leaves with their bases hiding the stem and nearly flat, white, long-lasting flowers on a branching flowering stem with up to ten flowers on each branch.

Phalaenopsis amabilis is native to Island Southeast Asia, New Guinea, and Australia. It has three subspecies: P. a. amabilis, native to the Philippines (Palawan), Malaysia (Borneo), Indonesia (Borneo, Sumatra, and Java); P. a. moluccana, native to the Maluku Islands (Seram and Buru Islands) and Sulawesi of Indonesia; and P. a. rosenstromii, native to Papua New Guinea and Australia (northeastern Queensland).

"moon orchid").

Description
The stem is  but hidden by the leaf bases. The side lobes curve upwards and partly surround the column. The middle lobe is cross-shaped with a rounded tip and two long, thread-like wavy arms. There is a large yellow callus near the base of the labellum. Flowering time depends on distribution but occurs from April to December in New Guinea.

Taxonomy and naming
In 1750, before the system of binomial nomenclature had been formalised by Carl Linnaeus, Georg Eberhard Rumphius had collected the species on Ambon Island and described it as Angraecum albus majus in his book Herbarium Amboinense. Linnaeus described it in Species Plantarum giving it the binomial Epidendrum amabile and in 1825, Carl Ludwig Blume changed the name to Phalaenopsis amabilis. The specific epithet (amabilis) is a Latin word meaning "lovely".

Subspecies

There are three subspecies of P. amabilis recognised by the World Checklist of Selected Plant Families:
 Phalaenopsis amabilis subsp. amabilis which is the most widespread subspecies and is distinguished from the other subspecies by its cross-shaped labellum middle lobe, the base of which has yellow and red markings;
 Phalaenopsis amabilis subsp. moluccana (Schltr.) Christenson which has a linear-oblong labellum middle lobe, with a slight dilation at its base where there are yellow and white markings;
 Phalaenopsis amabilis subsp. rosenstromii (F.M.Bailey) Christenson which has a relatively short, triangular labellum middle lobe where the markings are yellow;

In Australia, subspecies rosenstromii is recognised as Phalaenopsis rosenstromii by the Australian Plant Census. It was discovered by Gus Rosenstrom "on trees, high from the ground, Daintree River" and was first formally described by Frederick Manson Bailey who published the description in the Queensland Agricultural Journal.

Distribution and habitat
Phalaenopsis amabilis usually grows on trees, rarely on rocks, in rainforest where the humidity is high but there is free air movement. Subspecies amabilis has the widest distribution and occurs from Palawan in the southern Philippines to Borneo, Sumatra and Java. Subspecies moluccana is separated from subspecies amabilis by the Wallace Line and is found in Sulawesi as well as Seram and Buru in the Moluccas. Subspecies rosenstromii is native to New Guinea and Australia where it occurs on the Cape York Peninsula between the Iron Range and the Paluma Range National Park. It is separated from subspecies moluccana by Lydekker's Line.

Conservation
Phalaenopsis rosenstromii was listed as "endangered" under the Australian Government Environment Protection and Biodiversity Conservation Act 1999 but the listing was updated to Phalaenopsis amabilis subsp. rosenstromii in May 2016. The main threat to the subspecies in Australia is illegal collecting.

Use in horticulture
Phalaenopsis amabilis is reported to be very easy to grow as a houseplant, as long as attention is paid to a correct feeding and watering regimen. Specialist orchid compost and feed is widely available. Species and cultivars in the genus Phalaenopsis are recommended for beginners.

In cultivation in the United Kingdom, Phalaenopsis amabilis has gained the Royal Horticultural Society’s Award of Garden Merit.

Importance
Phalaenopsis amabilis ( meaning "moon orchid") is one of the three national flowers in Indonesia, the other two being the sambac jasmine and padma raksasa. It was officially recognized as national "flower of charm" in Presidential Decree No. 4 in 1993.

The orchid is also the official flower of Kota Kinabalu, the capital city of Sabah, Malaysia.

References

External links
 

amabilis
Orchids of Indonesia
Orchids of New Guinea
Orchids of the Philippines
National symbols of Indonesia
Plants described in 1753
Taxa named by Carl Linnaeus